Jan Christiaan Lindeman (26 June 1921 – 18 July 2007) was a Dutch botanist specialized in the Flora of Suriname. Lindeman worked in the Brazilian state of Paraná for years.

He also worked as a scientific researcher at the herbarium of Utrecht University.

Bibliography 
 The vegetation of the coastal region of Suriname. The vegetation of Suriname 1 1953
 Bomenboek voor Suriname. Dienst 'Lands Bosbeheer Suriname. (together with A.M.W.Mennega) 1963
 Topographic Index for Surinam. Flora of the Guianas Newsletter 6: 1-52.  1990

1921 births
2007 deaths
20th-century Dutch botanists
Utrecht University alumni
Academic staff of Utrecht University
People from Zutphen
Dutch expatriates in Brazil